The following lists events that happened during 2000 in Ukraine.

Incumbents
President: Leonid Kuchma
Prime Minister: Viktor Yushchenko

Events

Births
 July 17 – Miray Akay, actress

Deaths
September 17 – Georgiy Gongadze, journalist

References

 
2000s in Ukraine
Years of the 20th century in Ukraine
Ukraine
Ukraine